Gil Brandt (born March 4, 1932) is an American former football executive who was the vice president of player personnel in the National Football League (NFL) for the Dallas Cowboys from 1960 to 1988. He is a graduate of the University of Wisconsin.

Early years

A native of Milwaukee, he attended North Division High School where he was a 150-pound starting defensive back. He also lettered in basketball and track.

He enrolled at the University of Wisconsin, but left after two years.

Professional career

Brandt worked as a photographer who specialized in new-born babies and was employed as a part-time scout for the Los Angeles Rams based on a recommendation by Elroy Hirsch. In 1958, he was hired as a full-time scout by the San Francisco 49ers.

He served as the Dallas Cowboys' chief talent scout since the club's inception in 1960. He had served as a part-time scout for the Los Angeles Rams under General Manager Tex Schramm in the 1950s. When Schramm took command of the newly formed Dallas franchise in 1960, Brandt was one of the first people he hired. Schramm, Brandt and Coach Tom Landry formed the triumvirate which guided the Cowboys for their first 29 years.

He helped pioneer many of the scouting techniques used by NFL clubs today, such as:
 Creating a new scouting and evaluation system for prospects, which would later spread throughout the NFL. In the NFL Films' documentary series Finding Giants, Ernie Accorsi mentioned how then-general manager George Young built the New York Giants scouting process based on the Cowboys system.
 Using computers for scouting and talent evaluations. To achieve this level of automatization, the Cowboys had to systematically define which were the traits, measurable qualities and skills that could be expressed into numbers and formulas in order for a computer to understand them. Different traits were prioritized for different positions.
 Finding potential prospects in other sports such as: Bob Hayes, Cornell Green, Peter Gent, Toni Fritsch, Percy Howard, Ken Johnson, Ron Howard, Wade Manning, Manny Hendrix and Mac Percival. The Cowboys also set up hospitality suites for coaches at the NCAA basketball tournaments.
 Brandt was one of the first talent scouts to look outside of the United States and Canada for potential players. Kicker Toni Fritsch was discovered during a European tour.
 Made unconventional draft choices in lower rounds based on potential, even though at the time it wasn't known if the players would ever be a part of the National Football League. For example: Roger Staubach, Herschel Walker and Chad Hennings.
 The use of psychology tests to identify the mental and personality make-up of prospects.
 Finding players in the undrafted free agent and small college talent pool, such as Drew Pearson, Cliff Harris, and Everson Walls.
 Helped to create the NFL Scouting Combine as a centralization of the scouting evaluation process.

He also made a reputation of acquiring high draft choices by making impactful trades, which were used to select players like Randy White, Ed "Too Tall" Jones and Tony Dorsett.

Brandt's dismissal from the Cowboys on May 2, 1989, completed a purge that began with Jerry Jones' purchase of the franchise just over nine weeks prior on February 25 and also resulted in Landry's ouster and Schramm's resignation.

Controversy
Following the death of Pittsburgh Steelers quarterback Dwayne Haskins on the morning of April 9, 2022, during an interview on a Sirius XM NFL radio show later that same day, a host asked Brandt for his thoughts. Brandt replied that Haskins was "living to be dead, so to speak," and claimed that draft evaluators had criticized Haskins for his work ethic during his transition from college football to the NFL, stating, "It was always something. It was one of those, 'I'm not offsides, but they keep calling me for offsides.' It's a tragic thing. Anytime somebody dies it's tragic, especially when you're 24 years old and you've got your whole life ahead of you. Maybe if he'd have stayed in school an [extra] year, he wouldn't do silly things." Brandt's comments generated significant controversy, including from several other current and former NFL players like Haskins's former teammate Cameron Heyward, who called Brandt's comments "disgraceful," and former Dallas Cowboys wide receiver Dez Bryant, who called Brandt's comments "unacceptable." Several called for Brandt to lose his job in NFL radio over the comments. Brandt later apologized for the comments in a statement on Twitter, saying he "reacted carelessly and insensitively" and apologizing for his "poor choice of words."

Personal life
After a few years out of football, he returned as a print analyst and draft expert. He currently contributes to NFL.com as a senior analyst and is a major contributor in selecting the Playboy All-American football team. Brandt has also been responsible for inviting collegiate players to the NFL Draft every year. He is a regular on SiriusXM NFL Radio as a commentator on "Late Hits", "The Endzone", and the "SiriusXM NFL Tailgate Show".

He was inducted into the Texas Sports Hall of Fame on April 9, 2015.

He was announced as the 22nd member of the Cowboys' Ring of Honor on November 2, 2018.

On February 2, 2019, it was announced at the annual NFL Honors Awards that Brandt was elected to the Pro Football Hall of Fame, and his bust was sculpted by Scott Myers.

References

External links
 Gil Brandt's NFL.com archive
 A Shuttle Shakes Up The Pros
 The Dallas Cowboys Dynasty
 Gil Brandt From Photog To Super Scout

1932 births
Dallas Cowboys executives
Dallas Cowboys scouts
Living people
Los Angeles Rams scouts
National Football League general managers
San Francisco 49ers scouts
Sportspeople from Milwaukee
University of Wisconsin–Madison alumni
Pro Football Hall of Fame inductees
North Division High School (Milwaukee) alumni